Douban is a Chinese Web 2.0 website

Douban may also refer to:
Doubanjiang, spicy, salty paste made from fermented broad beans, soybeans

See also 
 Dobiran, known also as Dowban, a city in Iran
 Mont Dauban, a peak on Silhouette Island in the Seychelles
 Charles-Armel Doubane (born 1966), a Central African politician and diplomat